Franco Ferreiro and Flávio Saretta were the defending champions, but they didn't start this year.
Juan Pablo Brzezicki and David Marrero defeated Martín Cuevas and Pablo Cuevas 6–4, 6–4 in the final.

Seeds

Draw

Draw

References
 Doubles Draw

Copa Petrobras Montevideo - Doubles
2009 Doubles
2009 in Uruguayan tennis